The 2010–11 season was the 86th season in the history of Fussball-Club Luzern and the club's fifth consecutive season in the top flight of Swiss football.

Players

First-team squad

Transfers

Pre-season and friendlies

Competitions

Overall record

Swiss Super League

League table

Results summary

Results by round

Matches

Swiss Cup

UEFA Europa League

Third qualifying round

Notes

References

FC Luzern seasons
Luzern